Harold Hall may refer to:
Harold Hall (footballer) (1887–?), English footballer
Harold Hall (cricketer) (1875–1915), English cricketer
Harold Wesley Hall (1888–1974), Australian aviator and philanthropist
Harold Hall Australian Expeditions, 1960s ornithological expeditions sponsored by H. W. Hall

See also
Harry Hall (disambiguation)